The Mictini are a tribe of leaf-footed bugs, in the subfamily Coreinae erected by Amyot & Serville (as the "Mictides") in 1843.  Genera are distributed from Africa to South-East Asia.

Genera 
The Coreoidea Species File lists:
 Allocara Bergroth, 1894
 Amygdonia Schouteden, 1938
 Anoplocnemis Stål, 1873
 Aspilosterna Stål, 1873
 Aurelianus Distant, 1902
 Breddinella Dispons, 1962
 Callichlamydia Stål, 1873
 Canungrantmictis Brailovsky, 2002
 Cipia Stål, 1866
 Cossutia (bug) Stål, 1866
 Derepteryx White, 1839
 Dianomictis O'Shea, 1980
 Ditora Schouteden, 1938
 Dollingocoris O'Shea, 1980
 Elasmocnema Karsch, 1892
 Elasmocniella Brailovsky, 2011
 Elasmopoda Stål, 1873
 Fumua Schouteden, 1912
 Haglundina Schouteden, 1938
 Helcomeria Stål, 1873
 Kennetus Distant, 1904
 Kolleriella Schouteden, 1938
 Mercennus Distant, 1904
 Mictiopsis Hsiao, 1965
 Mictis Leach, 1814
 Molipteryx Kiritshenko, 1916
 Mygdonia (bug) Stål, 1866
 Myrrhina Linnavuori, 1973
 Neaira Linnavuori, 1973
 Neomictis O'Shea & Schaefer, 1980
 Notobitopsis Blöte, 1938
 Notopteryx Hsiao, 1963
 Ochrochira Stål, 1873
 Odontobola Stål, 1873
 Phyllogonia Stål, 1873
 Plectropoda Bergroth, 1894
 Plectropodoides Schouteden, 1938
 Prionolomia Stål, 1873
 Prionolomiopsis O'Shea, 1980
 Pseudomictis Hsiao, 1963
 Pseudophelaus Schouteden, 1938
 Pternistria Stål, 1873
 Puppeia Stål, 1866
 Raunothryallis Faúndez, 2016
 Rhamnomia Hsiao, 1963
 Schroederia (bug) Schmidt, 1911
 Schwetzia Schouteden, 1938
 Xyrophoreus Breddin, 1909

References

External links
 
 

Hemiptera tribes
Coreinae